Mount Benzarino is a  mountain summit located in North Cascades National Park, in Chelan County of Washington state. It is situated in the North Cascades, a subset of the Cascade Range.  The nearest higher neighbor is Corteo Peak,  to the northeast, and Black Peak is set  to the north. 

Corteo Peak and Mount Benzarino were named by Forest Service surveyor, Lage Wernstedt, for the names of Basque sheepherders he met near these two mountains. Lage Wernstedt made the first ascent of Benzarino in 1926. Remnants of a small glacier hang on its north flank, and precipitation runoff from the mountain drains into tributaries of Bridge Creek, which in turn is a tributary of the Stehekin River.

Climate
Mount Benzarino is located in the marine west coast climate zone of western North America. Most weather fronts originate in the Pacific Ocean, and travel northeast toward the Cascade Mountains. As fronts approach the North Cascades, they are forced upward by the peaks of the Cascade Range, causing them to drop their moisture in the form of rain or snowfall onto the Cascades (Orographic lift). As a result, the North Cascades experience high precipitation, especially during the winter months in the form of snowfall. During winter months, weather is usually cloudy, but, due to high pressure systems over the Pacific Ocean that intensify during summer months, there is often little or no cloud cover during the summer. Because of maritime influence, snow tends to be wet and heavy, resulting in high avalanche danger.

Geology

The North Cascades features some of the most rugged topography in the Cascade Range with craggy peaks, ridges, and deep glacial valleys. The history of the formation of the Cascade Mountains dates back millions of years ago to the late Eocene Epoch. With the North American Plate overriding the Pacific Plate, episodes of volcanic igneous activity persisted.  In addition, small fragments of the oceanic and continental lithosphere called terranes created the North Cascades about 50 million years ago.

During the Pleistocene period dating back over two million years ago, glaciation advancing and retreating repeatedly scoured the landscape leaving deposits of rock debris. The "U"-shaped cross section of the river valleys are a result of recent glaciation. Uplift and faulting in combination with glaciation have been the dominant processes which have created the tall peaks and deep valleys of the North Cascades area.

See also

 Geography of the North Cascades
 List of mountain peaks of Washington (state)

References

Gallery

External links
 National Park Service web site: North Cascades National Park
 Mount Benzarino weather: Mountain Forecast
 1926 summit photo by Lage Wernstedt: UW Libraries

North Cascades
Mountains of Washington (state)
Mountains of Chelan County, Washington
North Cascades National Park
Cascade Range
North Cascades of Washington (state)
North American 2000 m summits